"Faith in the Earth" is a concept referred to in the German philosopher Friedrich Nietzsche's mytho-poetic formulation of divinity, Thus Spoke Zarathustra.

References

Philosophy of Friedrich Nietzsche
Thus Spoke Zarathustra
Mythopoeia